{{Infobox lighthouse
  | image_name = Michigan City Lighthouse.jpg
  | location = Washington Park, Michigan City, Indiana
  | coordinates = 
  | yearbuilt = 1904
  | automated = 1960
  | foundation = concrete pier
  | construction = steel brick
  | marking = white, lantern black; fog signal building roof red
  | shape = octagonal on fog signal building
  | height = 
  | focalheight = 
  | lens = Fifth Order Fresnel lens<ref>But see, which indicates a Fourth Order Fresnel lens was original.</ref> (original), rotating 2130C (current)
  | characteristic = Fog horn (2 blasts every 30 s).
  | module = 
}}
The Michigan City Breakwater lighthouse is located in the harbor of Michigan City, Indiana.

This is the successor to the Old Michigan City Light, when the lantern, lens and light was moved to the new light at the end of the newly extended pier.

This is one of very few lights on the Great Lakes which still has the iron walkway atop the pier (see Manistee Pierhead lights and Grand Haven South Pierhead Inner Light).

There has been a lighthouse in Michigan City for 170 years.  However, "most people in Indiana don’t realize there is a lighthouse in the state."  Mayor Oberlie passes out lapel pins to illustrate its importance and scope.  He calls Lake Michigan "the city’s crown jewel," which became prominent when he was city planner in the 1970s.

In May 2007, this aid to navigation was deemed excess by the Coast Guard.  It was offered at no cost to eligible entities, including federal, state and local agencies, non-profit corporations, educational agencies, or community development organizations under the terms of the National Historic Lighthouse Preservation Act. "According to Mayor Chuck Oberlie, Michigan City filed a letter of interest for the lighthouse and will seek ownership."

It is one of a dozen past or present lighthouses in Indiana.

The old 1858 lighthouse, near the entrance to the park, is open as a museum every day except Mondays from 1 to 4 p.m.

See also
Lighthouses in the United States
National Historic Lighthouse Preservation Act

References

Further reading

 Andreas, A.T. (1884) History of Chicago from the Earliest Period to the Present Time,
 Chicago's Front Door, Chicago Public Library Digital Collection, website.
 Chicago, Scribner's Monthly (September 1875) Vol. X, No. 5.
 Graham, Charlote, Another Step into History at Old Michigan City Light (August, 2003) Lighthouse Digest.
 Harris, Patricia. Michigan City: Indiana's Only Lighthouse. The Keeper's Log (Spring, 1987), pp. 22–25.
 Hyde, Charles K., and Ann and John Mahan. (1995) The Northern Lights: Lighthouses of the Upper Great Lakes.  Detroit: Wayne State University Press.  .
 Havighurst, Walter (1943) The Long Ships Passing: The Story of the Great Lakes, Macmillan Publishers.
 Karamanski, T. Ed., Historic Lighthouses and Navigational Aids of the Illinois Shore of Lake Michigan Loyola University & Illinois Historic Preservation Agency, (1989).
 Longstreet, Stephen (1973) Chicago 1860-1919 (New York: McKay).
 Lopez, Victor. "This Old Lighthouse: Chicago Harbor Beacon Gets a Facelift." Coast Guard (September, 1997), pp. 24–25.
 Mayer, Harold M. (1957) The Port of Chicago University of Chicago Press.
 
 Rice, Mary J., Chicago: Port to the World (Follet Publishers, 1969).
 Richards, Rick A. Michigan City's Love Affair With Its Lighthouse July, 2009, Lighthouse Digest.
 Sapulski, Wayne S., (2001) Lighthouses of Lake Michigan: Past and Present'' (Paperback) (Fowlerville: Wilderness Adventure Books) ; .

External links
 National Park Service, Maritime History Project, Inventory of Historic Lights, Michigan City Lights.
 Satellite view at Google Maps.
 

Lighthouses on the National Register of Historic Places in Indiana
Lighthouses completed in 1904
National Register of Historic Places in LaPorte County, Indiana
Transportation buildings and structures in LaPorte County, Indiana
Tourist attractions in LaPorte County, Indiana
1904 establishments in Indiana